The Mike Durfee State Prison is a South Dakota state prison for men on the campus of what was University of South Dakota at Springfield, United States.

History
It is named for Mike Durfee who was a standout athlete and teacher at the school.
It opened under the name of Springfield State Prison in 1984 with women from the prison at Yankton, South Dakota.  It became coed in 1985 with males being admitted.
It became all male in 1997 when the women were transferred to Herm Solem Public Safety Center in Pierre, South Dakota. In 1999 it was named for Mike Durfee who had been with the school and was Deputy Director of the South Dakota Department of Corrections.

References

External links
Official page
Profile of Mike Durfee

Buildings and structures in Bon Homme County, South Dakota
Prisons in South Dakota
1984 establishments in South Dakota